Events from the year 1885 in Scotland.

Incumbents 

 Secretary for Scotland and Keeper of the Great Seal – from 17 August The Duke of Richmond

Law officers 
 Lord Advocate – John Blair Balfour until July; then John Macdonald
 Solicitor General for Scotland – Alexander Asher; then James Robertson

Judiciary 
 Lord President of the Court of Session and Lord Justice General – Lord Glencorse
 Lord Justice Clerk – Lord Moncreiff

Events 
 18 April – Scottish Catholic Observer first published as The Glasgow Observer.
 1 June – the Glasgow and South Western Railway's Largs Branch is completed throughout to Largs.
 10 June – breed standard for Highland cattle first defined (in Inverness) and herd book first produced.
 27 June – The Shetland News first published in Lerwick.
 1 July – the Glasgow and South Western Railway's Paisley Canal Line is opened on the course of the abandoned Glasgow, Paisley and Johnstone Canal.
 6 August – the Portpatrick and Wigtownshire Joint Railway is officially formed, in the joint ownership of the Caledonian, Glasgow and South Western, London and North Western and Midland Railways.
 17 August – the post of Secretary for Scotland is revived to be in charge of the Scottish Office, Charles Gordon-Lennox, 6th Duke of Richmond, being the first appointee.
 1 October – the Alloa Railway's Alloa swing bridge over the River Forth is opened.
 24 November – 18 December: 1885 United Kingdom general election: five MPs from or allied with the Crofters Party are elected.
 General Accident and Employers' Liability Assurance Association Ltd., a predecessor of Aviva, established in Perth.
 Ailsa Shipbuilding Company established at Troon.
 North British Distillery established in Edinburgh.
 Scapa distillery established on Mainland, Orkney.
 Hugh Tennent first brews lager at the Wellpark Brewery, Glasgow.
 Experimental hydroelectricity scheme for public supply at Greenock initiated.
 Fidra lighthouse built.

Births 
 21 January – Duncan Grant, painter (died 1978 in England)
 16 February – Will Fyffe, music hall entertainer (died 1947)
 23 March – John Fraser, surgeon and academic (died 1947)
 8 April – John Kerr, cricketer (died 1972)
 29 April – Andrew Young, poet and clergyman (died 1971 in England)
 22 June – James Maxton, socialist and leader of the Independent Labour Party (died 1946)
 8 September – Douglas Guthrie, otolaryngologist and medical historian (died 1975)
 13 September – John Beazley, Classical archaeologist (died 1970)
 1 October – William Miller Macmillan, colonial historian (died 1974 in England)
 F. Marian McNeill, folklorist (died 1973)
 Winifred Rushforth, née Bartholomew, psychoanalyst (died 1983)

Deaths 
 2 April – James Edward Alexander, soldier, traveller and author (born 1803)
 16 July – William Graham, wine merchant, art patron and Liberal politician (born 1817)

The arts
"Glasgow Boys" first exhibit collectively, at the Glasgow Institute of the Fine Arts.
Aberdeen Art Gallery opens.
English painter Fra Newbery is appointed Principal of Glasgow School of Art, where he will serve until 1917.

Sport

Seasons 
1884–85 and 1885–86 Scottish Cups (Association football)
1884–85 and 1885–86 British Home Championships (Association football)
1885 Open Championship (golf) on the Old Course at St Andrews
1885 Home Nations Championship (rugby union)

Events 
 May – Clydesdale Harriers established in Glasgow as Scotland's first open amateur athletics club.
 12 September – Arbroath 36–0 Bon Accord is the world's highest scoring professional Association football match until 2002.

Establishments 
Caledonian F.C., Inverness
Clachnacuddin F.C., Inverness
Clackmannan F.C.
Cronberry Eglinton F.C.
Dundee Wanderers F.C.
Dunfermline Athletic F.C.
Forfar Athletic F.C.
Glenurquhart Shinty Club
Inverness Thistle F.C.
Lanemark F.C., New Cumnock
Lesmahagow F.C.
Orion F.C., Aberdeen
St Johnstone F.C., Perth (officially formed 24 February, though its origins and founding date is 1884)
Wishaw F.C.

Closures 
Eastern F.C.

See also 
 Timeline of Scottish history

References 

 
Years of the 19th century in Scotland
Scotland
1880s in Scotland